The angayukaksurak char (Salvelinus anaktuvukensis) is a type of salmonid fish found in Alaska in a few select Brooks Range headwaters.

It was described as a distinct species on morphological grounds by Morrow in 1973, but the concept of a separate species status was soon refuted, even by Morrow himself. Further genetic studies have also failed to distinguish this fish from the more widespread Dolly Varden trout (Salvelinus malma malma), and it is now considered to represent natural variation within that subspecies.

Sources

 Salvelinus anaktuvukensis FishBase, read 9.4.2012 ("Issue: This species is synonym of Salvelinus malma in CofF ver. May 2011 following Scharpf (2006)")

Fauna of the United States
Salvelinus
Fish described in 1973
Taxonomy articles created by Polbot
Taxobox binomials not recognized by IUCN 
Fauna without expected TNC conservation status
Endemic fauna of Alaska